ABP Majha is a Marathi news TV channel based in Mumbai, Maharashtra. Rajiv Khandekar is the executive editor of the channel. Anandabazar Patrika News is the abbreviation for ABP News Network Pvt. Ltd. i.e. ABP Group operates a multiple Language news channel in India. Its headquarters are in the Indian city of Noida.

Address of ABP Majha is ABP NEWS CENTER,
301, Boston House, 3rd Floor, Suren Road, 
Andheri - East, Mumbai-400093, India.
Fax: +91 22 61277790 / 66160243
Tel: +91 22 66160200

The channel was previously called Star Majha until 1 June 2012. ABP Group acquired its ownership from Star, making it a part of the larger ABP news network.

References

External links

 ABP Majha Corporate Website

Television stations in Mumbai
Marathi-language television channels
24-hour television news channels in India
Television channels and stations established in 2007
ABP Group
Former News Corporation subsidiaries
Mass media in Mumbai
Mass media in Maharashtra
2007 establishments in Maharashtra